Jackson Stell (born 1990), known by his stage name of Big Wild, is an American electronic producer, composer, vocalist and sound engineer.

As a performer, his live shows often consist of switching between multiple instruments (drum pads, synths, keyboards and live vocals). Coinciding with the release of his debut album, Superdream, Big Wild kicked off a world tour in the Spring of 2019.

Career
Stell began his music career as a hip-hop beat producer, known as J Beatz, in his native Massachusetts at the age of 14. Stell graduated from Northeastern University and worked as a composer for an advertising agency before moving to Los Angeles, where he switched his focus to producing electronic music and singing under the moniker Big Wild.

In 2015, Big Wild began touring with electronic duo Odesza; later that year, he collaborated with the duo on a remix of their track "Say My Name". Big Wild's first breakout track, "Aftergold" featuring Tove Styrke, was released in April 2015, topping the Spotify Global Viral chart upon release. He released his debut EP, Invincible, in February 2017.

In February 2019, after signing with Counter Records, Big Wild released his debut album, Superdream. The new album debuted Big Wild as the primary vocalist, lyricist, and songwriter for the first time. Rooted in electronica, the album also features elements of energetic pop, indie and disco.

In September 2022, Big Wild released his second album, The Efferusphere.

Personal life 
Stell lives with his wife in Portland, Oregon. Many members of Stell's family are also musicians; his father played guitar and participated in a few bands throughout college, his mother was a life long choir singer, and his grandmother was a big band vocalist in the 1930s and 1940s.

In late September 2013, Stell was diagnosed with thyroid cancer. He announced he was "healthy and cured" in an Instagram post, in which he also shared his struggles with depression. His experience battling and recovering from thyroid cancer inspired the song "Maker" on his album Superdream.

Discography

Albums

Extended plays

Singles

Remixes

References

External links 
 

American DJs
People from Lancaster, Massachusetts
Living people
American electronic musicians
Foreign Family Collective artists
Electronic dance music DJs
1990 births